Lars Lennart Forsberg (31 July 1933 – 3 January 2012) was a Swedish film director and screenwriter. At the 7th Guldbagge Awards his film Mistreatment won the awards for Best Film and Best Director. He directed 20 films between 1969 and 2005.

Selected filmography
 Mistreatment (1969)
 Jänken (1970)
 Christopher's House (1979)

References

External links

1933 births
2012 deaths
Swedish film directors
Swedish screenwriters
Swedish male screenwriters
Writers from Stockholm
Best Director Guldbagge Award winners